State Route 243 (SR 243) was a  north–south state highway located in the central part of the U.S. state of Georgia. It existed in portions of Wilkinson and Baldwin counties.

The former portion of SR 243 that was concurrent with U.S. Route 441 Business (US 441 Bus.) was redesignated as SR 29 Bus. The portion from southwest of Gordon to north-northeast of Ivey, as well as the later roadway that was built from that point to southeast of Milledgeville became concurrent with SR 540, the state highway designation for the Fall Line Freeway (FLF; a highway that connects Columbus with Augusta), and was replaced in 2019 by an extended SR 540.

The entire final routing of the highway may be incorporated into the proposed eastern extension of Interstate 14 (I-14), which is currently entirely within Central Texas and may be extended into Augusta.

Route description
Former SR 243 began at an intersection with SR 57/SR 540 (Fall Line Freeway/Maddox Road) southwest of Gordon, in Wilkinson County. At this intersection, it began a concurrency with SR 540 as part of the Fall Line Freeway. The two highways traveled to the north-northeast. After a curve to the northeast, they crossed over Little Commissioner Creek and some railroad tracks of Norfolk Southern Railway. Here, they briefly entered the far western part of Gordon. After leaving the city limits of Gordon, they intersected SR 18 (Gray Highway). They curved to the east-southeast and re-entered Gordon. They left the city limits again. After a curve to the north-northeast, they briefly re-entered the city for a final time. After curving to the north-northeast, they crossed over Lake Tchukolaho on the McCook Bridge. They traveled through the town of Ivey, where they crossed over Beaver Creek and skirted past Brooks Lake. They curved to the northeast to an intersection where SR 540 split off to the northeast and SR 243 turned left to the north-northwest. After the highway separated from the Fall Line Freeway, it had a more northerly routing. Almost immediately, SR 243 entered Baldwin County and crossed a Central of Georgia Railway line. The highway curved to the northeast until it reached the unincorporated community of Scottsboro. There, it had an intersection with US 441/SR 29. After the intersection, SR 243 was concurrent with US 441 Business for the rest of its length. The highway headed north through Hardwick, and entered Milledgeville. It crossed over Fishing Creek on the Mayor Harry G. Bone Bridge. US 441 Business/SR 243 traveled north into downtown Milledgeville, along South Wayne Street. They turned left on West Franklin Street, passed Memory Hill Cemetery, and then turned right on South Clark Street before intersecting SR 49 (West Hancock Street). Just after this intersection, the two highways traveled along the southwestern edge of Georgia College, and intersected SR 22/SR 24 (West Montgomery Street). Here, SR 243 met its northern terminus, while US 441 Business continued north.

The only sections of former SR 243 that were part of the National Highway System, a system of routes determined to be the most important for the nation's economy, mobility and defense, were the section that traveled along the Fall Line Freeway and the section that was concurrent with US 441 Business.

History
SR 243 was established in 1946 along an alignment from Gordon to Scottsboro. By 1952, the section from the southern terminus to about Ivey and a section just southwest of Scottsboro were paved. In 1953, the entire route from Gordon to Scottsboro was paved.. Between 2013 and 2015, a new road was built from SR 243 north-northeast of Ivey to US 441/SR 29 south-southeast of Scottsboro. The segment between the Scottsboro and Sandersville areas was completed and opened to traffic in October 2016. In 2016, the new portion of highway was extended to SR 24 southeast of Milledgeville, and SR 243 was shifted onto it. The entire portion that had been concurrent with US 441 Bus. in Milledgeville was redesignated as SR 29 Bus. Between the beginning of 2017 and the beginning of 2019, SR 243 was decommissioned, with its final routing being entirely replaced by SR 540.

Major intersections
This table shows the final routing of the highway (2016-2019).

See also

References

External links

0243
Transportation in Wilkinson County, Georgia
Transportation in Baldwin County, Georgia
Milledgeville micropolitan area, Georgia